Mark Costello may refer to:
Mark Costello (author), American author
Mark Costello (Iowa politician) (born 1961), Iowa state legislator
Mark Costello (Oklahoma politician) (1955–2015), Oklahoma Labor Commissioner